Arthur Postle (1881-1965), Australian athlete
David E. Postle (1863 – 1939), American architecture
Herbert Postle (1884-1961), Australian politician
Joy Postle (1896-1989), American environmentalist
Martin Postle (born 1950), British art historian
Matt Postle (born 1970), Welsh racing cyclist

See also
Postles (surname)